Charters Towers is a railway station on the Great Northern line at Charters Towers,  west of Townsville in North Queensland, Australia.

History
The line arrived at Charters Towers in December 1882 and eventually extended west to the city of Mount Isa in 1929. The line was built initially to connect Charters Towers with the Port of Townsville. The spark was the discovery of gold that had taken place in January 1872. Seven years later the rise in gold returns convinced the government to connect the centre to the coast with a more reliable transport conduit. The station was built at Queenton, midway between the two population centres of Charters Towers and Millchester. This was in a part to appease both townships and for practical purposes given the country here was flat. The station was opened in December 1882 by Premier Thomas McIlwraith.

The distance to the town put the onus on the more prominent hotels to 'meet the train' and transport travellers up Hospital Hill via Gill Street into the town centre. The station building was demolished in 1983 and replaced.

The station was photographed by Allom and Bailey in 1887. The first image shows the station at Queenton looking east while the other shows the crossing looking west towards Charters Towers.

The crossing remains in place and still creates traffic holdups.

The signals, crane and subway at the station were listed on the Queensland Heritage Register on 30 October 2008.

Services
Charters Towers is served by Traveltrain's Inlander service.

References

Further reading
Brumby, Michael (2006). Charters Towers: 1887. Charters Towers: CTADAG Northern Miner 5 December 1901

External links
Charters Towers station Queensland's Railways on the Internet

Charters Towers
Railway stations in Australia opened in 1882
Regional railway stations in Queensland